Vladimir Prokhorovich Amalitskii (1860–1917) (alternative spelling: Amalitzky) was a paleontologist and professor at Warsaw University who was involved in the discovery and excavation of the Late Permian fossil vertebrate fauna from the North Dvina River, Arkhangelsk District, Northern European Russia. He made a number of studies of the fossil remains of amphibians and reptiles from Northern Russia.

Partial bibliography
 Amalitskii, V.P., Dvinosauridae  Petrograd : Akademicheskaia tip., 1921. 16 p., 4 leaves of plates : ill. -- (Severodvinskie raskopki professora V.P. Amalitskogo ;
 Amalitskii, V.P.,  Seymouridae, Petrograd : Akademicheskaia tip., 1921. 14 p., [3] leaves of plates : ill. -- (Severodvinskie raskopki professora V.P. Amalitskogo ; 2)
 Amalitzky, V.P., 1922, Diagnoses of the new forms of vertebrates and plants from the upper Permian of North Dvina: Bulletin de l’Académie des Sciences de l'URSS, Math and Natural Sciences, 1922, p. 329-340. and in Izv. Ross. Akad. Nauk, Ser. 6 25 (1), 1–12.

External links 
 V. Amalitskii bibliography in information system "History of Geology and Minimg".

1860 births
1917 deaths
People from Zhytomyr Oblast
People from Zhitomirsky Uyezd
Paleontologists from the Russian Empire
Science writers from the Russian Empire
Academic staff of the University of Warsaw